Lkhagvadulam Purev-Ochir is a Mongolian film director. She is most noted for her 2022 short film Snow in September (9-р Сарын Цас), which was the winner of the Orizzonti award for Best Short Film at the 79th Venice International Film Festival and the award for Best International Short Film at the 2022 Toronto International Film Festival.

Her debut short film, Mountain Cat (Shiluus), was screened in the short films competition at the 2020 Cannes Film Festival, and won the Sonje Award for Best Asian Short Film at the 25th Busan International Film Festival.

Her debut feature film, Ze, is in development.

References

External links

Mongolian film directors
Mongolian screenwriters
Mongolian women film directors
Mongolian women writers
Living people
Year of birth missing (living people)